Matthew Setzer is a musician/music technologist living in Los Angeles.

Guitarist for Skinny Puppy and London After Midnight he has toured worldwide in the gothic industrial scene.  Venturing outside those bounds he is co-producer and musician for world electronic project INDRADEVI and punk opera group Timur and the Dime Museum.  Active in the flesh hook suspension community he has blended interactive music technology with ritual performance art, notably with Constructs of Ritual Evolution (CoRE) and Aesthetic Meat Front (AMF).  Both groups have utilized an array of sensors/biofeedback/and experimental live music.  Matthew helped facilitate the only live flesh hook suspension aired on US network television- Jane's Addiction on the Jimmy Kimmel Show.  Whether on tour or producing music at his studio (Wonderland Recording Studio LLC) Matthew often daydreams of his childhood growing up in Montana.

Matthew studied experimental sound at CalArts.  Teachers include: David Rosenboom (composition, biofeedback systems), Ajay Kapur (programming, robotics), Mark Trayle (Max/MSP, interface design), Ulrich Krieger (composition, ritual methods), Morton Subotnick (composition), and visiting artist Trimpin (robotics).  He developed an interactive microphone enabling a performer to control audio/video elements with gestural movements.  While studying with David Rosenboom Matthew developed a musical electroencephalograph biofeedback system.  This technology has been used for a ritual suspension with Louis Fleischauer (AMF) in France, Japan, and the USA.

Before CalArts Matthew trained with John Carruthers for luthier skills.  From 2006 to 2008 Matthew worked as a luthier for the Moser Custom shop with Neal Moser.  Matthew built his touring guitar (a Les Paul with an altered head stock) from the ground up.

Since 2016 Setzer has played guitar for Los Angeles-based Electronic Musician KANGA

Education

 2005 Bachelor of Music in Composition/Technology from the University of Montana
 2006 Academic certificate in Luthier Skills from the Musicians Institute
 2008 Masters of Fine Arts in Experimental Sound Practices California Institute of the Arts

Notes

Musicians from California
Gothic rock musicians
American industrial musicians
Musicians from Montana
Living people
Year of birth missing (living people)